Nelly van Bommel  is a choreographer born in France to Dutch parents. She emigrated to the United States in 2002. As of 2012 she was a visiting assistant professor at SUNY Purchase and by 2020 she was Director of their Conservatory.

References

French choreographers
Year of birth missing (living people)
Living people